Sir Thomas Barlow, 1st Baronet,  (4 November 1845 – 12 January 1945) was a British royal physician, known for his research on infantile scurvy.

Life
Barlow was the son of a Lancashire cotton manufacturer and Mayor of Bolton, James Barlow (1821–1887). The family were well known as philanthropists in their home village of Edgworth, Lancashire where they funded charities connected with the Methodist church including the Children's Home.

He studied as an undergraduate at Manchester and London. University College London (UCL) Bachelor of Medicine (BM) in 1873 and Doctor of Medicine (MD) 1874.  He became a registrar at Great Ormond Street Hospital, and later a physician and in 1899 a consultant. He was professor at the UCL from 1895 to 1907, initially of paediatrics and later of clinical medicine.

In 1883, he showed that infantile scurvy was identical with adult scurvy. Barlow's disease – infantile scurvy – is named after him.

He was Royal Physician to Queen Victoria and attended her on her death, and to Edward VII and King George V.
He was knighted as a Knight Commander of the Royal Victorian Order in March 1901, and in February 1902 he was created a Baronet, of Wimpole Street in St Marylebone in the County of London. He was President of the Royal College of Physicians from 1910–1914 and delivered their Harveian Oration in 1916 on the subject of Harvey, The Man and the Physician. He was elected a Foreign Honorary Member of the American Academy of Arts and Sciences in 1918.

Barlow married Ada Helen Dalmahoy, daughter of Patrick Dalmahoy WS, on 28 December 1880. They had the following children:

 Sir James Alan Noel Barlow, 2nd Bt. (1881–1968), who married Emma Nora Darwin, the granddaughter of Charles Darwin (see Darwin — Wedgwood family).
 Sir Thomas Dalmahoy Barlow (1883–1964)
 Patrick Basil Barlow (23 October 1884 – 18 January 1917), killed in the First World War
 Helen Alice Dorothy Barlow (4 May 1887 – 16 September 1975), died unmarried - see Re Barlow's Will Trusts.
 Gertrude Mary Barlow (August 1888 – 22 July 1889), died in infancy

Barlow received the honorary degree Doctor of Science (D.Sc.) from the Victoria University of Manchester in February 1902, in connection with the 50th jubilee celebrations of the establishment of the university. In 1904, he was listed honorary medical staff at King Edward VII's Hospital for Officers.

Barlow's papers are preserved in the archive of the Wellcome Library.

Death
He died 12 January 1945 at 10 Wimpole Street, London aged 99.

References

External links

Sir Thomas Barlow at UCL
 
 AIM25: Wellcome Library: Barlow, Sir Thomas (1845–1945) at www.aim25.ac.uk
 Biography

1845 births
1945 deaths
19th-century English medical doctors
20th-century English medical doctors
Academics of University College London
Alumni of University College London
Baronets in the Baronetage of the United Kingdom
British paediatricians
Fellows of the American Academy of Arts and Sciences
Fellows of the Royal College of Physicians
Fellows of the Royal Society
Knights Commander of the Royal Victorian Order
People from Edgworth